North Dakota Highway 30 (ND 30) is a state highway in the U.S. State of North Dakota. The highway is currently broken up into three separate segments.

Major intersections

Notes

External links

The North Dakota Highways Page by Chris Geelhart

030
Transportation in Logan County, North Dakota
Transportation in Stutsman County, North Dakota
Transportation in Wells County, North Dakota
Transportation in Benson County, North Dakota
Transportation in Pierce County, North Dakota
Transportation in Rolette County, North Dakota